The Forkenbrock Funeral Home, at 234 E. Pine St. in Missoula, Montana, is a Colonial Revival-style building which was built to serve as a mortuary and funeral home in 1929.  It was listed on the National Register of Historic Places in 1984.

It was originally known as the Geraghty Funeral Home.

References

External links
 

Death care companies of the United States
National Register of Historic Places in Missoula, Montana
Colonial Revival architecture in Montana
Buildings and structures completed in 1929
Death in Montana